Big Dick may refer to:
An unusually large human penis size
"Big Dick", a comic strip by Joe Johnson
Big Dick Creek, a stream in Idaho, United States
Big Dick Dudley, an American wrestler
Big Dick Lake, a lake in Minnesota, United States
Big Dick Point, a summit in Idaho, United States